Finck is a surname or part of a longer surname of German origin and the name of several individuals:

 Count Albrecht Konrad Finck von Finckenstein (1660–1735), Prussian field marshal
 Count Karl-Wilhelm Finck von Finckenstein (1714–1800), Prussian Prime Minister
 Countess Eva Finck von Finckenstein (1903–1994), German politician
 , German politician
 August Georg Heinrich von Finck (1898–1980), German banker
 August von Finck Jr. (1930–2021), German banker and entrepreneur
 August François von Finck (born 1968), German businessman
 David Finck (born 1958), American jazz bassist
 David Finck (Luthier)
  (born 1978), German writer
 Ethel Finck (1932 – 2003), American interventional radiologist and inventor
 Franz Nikolaus Finck (1867–1910), German linguist
 Friedrich August von Finck (1718–1766), Prussian soldier
 Heinrich Finck (1445–1527), German composer of the Renaissance
 Hermann Finck (1527–1558), German composer, music theorist and organist of the Renaissance, great-nephew of Heinrich Finck
 Hermine Finck (1872–1932), German operatic soprano
 , Prussian general
 Nick Finck (born 1975), Publisher, author, speaker, and user experience designer
 Pierre Joseph Étienne Finck (1797–1870), French mathematician
 Robin Finck (born 1971), American rock guitarist (worked with Guns N' Roses and Nine Inch Nails)
 Werner Finck (1902–1978), German comedian 
 Wilhelm von Finck (1848-1924), German banker
 William E. Finck (1822–1901), U.S. Congressman from Ohio

Other uses
 FiNCK, a video game by Nicklas Nygren

See also 
 Fink (disambiguation)
 Finke
 Funk (disambiguation)

German-language surnames